The Special Forces and Elite Forces include both a specially and higher trained unit and a small percentage of personnel from a specific Malaysian military branch, law enforcement or government agency. In Malaysia, the term 'Special Forces' is widely used by uniformed services for special forces, special operations forces and 'special' trained units while 'Elite Forces' for units that more trained and capable combat. Regular personnel must undertake specialized and higher training to be able to join the units of the 'Special and Elite Forces'. These 'Special and Elite Forces' are denoted by different beret colours, shoulder tabs, unit patches, skill badges and uniforms.

Terminology

Special Forces 
In Malaysia, the word 'Special' is only applied to the personnel who pass Kursus Asas Komando (Basic Commando Course) and Kursus Asas Unit Tindakhas (Basic Special Actions Course). Each of their special forces will also get a special allowances on a monthly basis. Their operators are trained for urban operations, airborne operations and underwater operations.

The term Pasukan Khas (Special Forces) can only be formally applied to these seven units and they also once used to work together under one security unit or formation special operations forces called NSOF as the first responder to any terror threats in Malaysia. They also can be deployed in counter-terrorism operations outside Malaysia territory.

Only one of these seven units accept women into their ranks—the Special Actions Unit.

Elite Forces
Higher trained combat units (excluding the seven units above) are formally referred to as the Pasukan Berkebolehan Operasi Khas ( Special Operations Capable Forces). Pasukan Berkebolehan Operasi Khas in the Malay Language also can be translated in English as 'military units whose equivalent to special forces'. Also known as Pasukan Elit (Elite Forces) or Unit Elit (Elite Units). Elite Forces or Special Operations Capable Forces are the general term for combat forces that are usually have an additional training, equipments and more operationally capable than regular infantry unit and be deployed as a team, or attached to another Special Forces unit to provide combat support.

It is not compulsory for its members to pass the special courses such as the Basic Commando Course and Basic Special Action Course. However, there are several commando-trained soldiers who have been transferred from the special force units to the Elite Forces to lead, as instructors, or in a combat role.

Special Rescue Unit 
Specially trained non-combat units are tasked to conduct Search and Rescue (SAR) operations. These units are trained and selected using standards applied by the Malaysian military special operation forces, and its members are entrusted with using equipment or methods affiliated with special operations forces in conducting SAR operations.

History

Old Malay Kingdom and Sultanate

The concept of Elite Forces is not new to Malaysia. Malaysia has used variations of elite forces since the Kingdom of Singapura (1299–1398) and the Malacca Sultanate (1400–1511). During the Malacca Sultanate, the Hulubalangs were its elite forces. Some were tasked with guarding the Sultan and served as right-hand men for the Bendahara (Chief Minister) and the Laksamana (Admiral). Hulubalang was a high ranking Pendekar (Warrior). After the fall of the Malacca Sultanate, the term of Hulubalang was used to designate the elite warriors of the other Malay sultanates and warlords. In the Aceh Sultanate, under Sultan Iskandar Muda (1583–1636), a new nobility, Uleëbalang was established for warlords. The Uleëbalang was given lands (feudal tenure) and rights to rule by the Sultan. The Hulubalang is equivalent to a knight, while the Uleëbalang in the Aceh Sultanate is equivalent to a baron.

World War II

Malaysia began using modern special forces during World War II. Fighting unconventionally behind enemy lines against Japanese Imperial Forces, Force 136 was a multinational guerrilla unit under Britain's Special Operations Executive (SOE). Tasked to perform unconventional warfare in Southeast Asia, some Force 136 personnel were inserted into Malaya via parachute and submarine, and established local Force 136 forces—the Force 136 (Malaya). Force 136 actively fought the Japanese occupation in Malaya from 1941 to 1945.

Malayan Emergency 

The surrender of Japanese Imperial Forces left a power vacuum in Malaya. The British were still recovering from WWII and their focus was on domestic affairs. This allowed Malayas WWII allies, the Malayan People's Anti-Japanese Army (MPAJA) and the Communist Party of Malaya (CPM), to take the seat of power and form an independent government with a socialist economy, and began assassinating Malayans who had collaborated with the Japanese during the Japanese occupation of Malaya. After their truce was broken in 1947, a war broke out known as the Malayan Emergency (1948-1960) in which the communist forces of the Malayan National Liberation Army fought against the British colonial government.  After two years of fighting, the BMA realised that conventional forces were not effectively fighting the MPAJA, so the elite unconventional special forces were established.

Ferret Force

On 6 July 1948, Colonel John Davis, former Force 136 commander, was entrusted to establish a special jungle-guerrilla force for anti-insurgent operations—The Ferret Forces. Two patrols from the Malay Regiment, two patrols from the Gurkha Regiment and a headquarters group made up the pioneer forces. The Ferret Force later expanded and the police unit, and Europeans with special operations experience, including Colonel Richard Broome, a Force 136 veteran, was added to the force.

Malayan Scouts
After conditions worsened, General Sir John Harding, commander-in-chief of the Far East Land Forces, began looking for officers experienced in Jungle Warfare. Major Mike Calvert, a veteran of the Chindits (a British India special force during World War II), volunteered to assess the situation in Malaya. He was later given permission to set up a special force to operate in the deep jungle. He named the special force the Malayan Scouts. The success of the Malayan Scouts in the Malayan Emergency campaign led the British Government to absorb the forces into the regular British military. After 1958, the Malayan Scouts became known as the 22nd Special Air Service Regiment (22 SAS). The Malayan Scouts are considered the forefathers of the modern Malaysian Special Forces.

Special Branch
The Special Branch (SB) is an intelligence unit of the Malayan Police. Initially established as a successor to the British Malayan Security Service (MSS), the SB is tasked to become a special intelligence unit during a Malayan emergency, under the recommendation of Major Mike Calvert of the Malayan Scouts. The SB is responsible for providing intelligence to other special forces using secret agents planted inside the CPM and MPAJA.

Sarawak Rangers
The Sarawak Rangers have existed since 1862 during the reign of the White Rajahs in Sarawak, North Borneo. Originally a police force for the White Rajahs, the unit was disbanded in the 1930s for economic reasons but was later reactivated in 1946 to fight the Japanese during World War II. The history between the Sarawak Rangers and Borneoan British Military Administration (BMA) began after the British employed the Sarawak Rangers as trackers for the British Civil Liaison Corps in August 1948 for six months. Captivated by their skills and abilities, the Malayan British Military Administration recruited the Iban people into one independent fighting element attached to the Malayan BMA in the Malay Peninsula. These new Sarawak Rangers were selected, trained, and equipped by the Malayan Scouts (SAS). This unit grew to 200 men by the end of the Malayan Emergency.

Senoi Praaq
General Gerald Templer, the High Commissioner of Malaya, proposed a second SAS Squadron to the War Office in London for the Malayan Emergency jungle warfare effort. The proposal was rejected and this led General Templar to form a small experimental unit composed of Orang Asli (Aboriginal people of Malay Peninsula) to help the existing SAS Squadron in 1956. Called the Senoi Praak (English spelling is Senoi Praaq), or War People in the Semai language, the SAS trained the Aboriginal people in military tactics. The Senoi Praaq was given commando status and attached to the Malayan Scouts (SAS) as the SAS Auxiliary Force.

The Senoi Praaq was the brainchild of Colonel R.O.D. Noone, an intelligence officer in the Directorate of Military Intelligence and a member of the British Military Administration in Malaya. The military forces employ jungle experts from Orang Asli and Sarawak Rangers as trackers for all military operations. This led Colonel Noone to draft a proposal to organise all the Orang Asli trackers into one special unit like to the Sarawak Rangers. After the proposal was approved by General Templer, Colonel Noone was made Senoi Praaq's first commander. The Senoi Praaq were effective in jungle warfare, and Colonel Noone was loaned for a year, at request of the president of South Vietnam, to the U.S. Central Intelligence Agency (CIA) to establish the Montagnard Scouts during the Vietnam War. Noone and the Senoi Praaq were put under the CIA Mountain Scout Program (MSP). The Montagnard Scouts were attached to the U.S. Army Special Forces, Military Assistance Command, Vietnam – Studies and Observations Group (MACV-SOG) and the Long-range reconnaissance patrol (LRRP; predecessor to the 75th Ranger Regiment).

Post Independence, Indonesia—Malaysia confrontation and Second Malayan Emergency

As a new nation, the Federation of Malaya relied heavily on the Commonwealth of Nations for military assistance. The Malayan Emergency was reaching its end and the Malayan Armed Forces began to expand its strength. In 1963 Sabah, Sarawak, and Singapore joined the federation, forming Malaysia. This unity displeased Sukarno, the first president of Indonesia who was also pro-communist, and he accused Malaysia of being a new form of colonization by the British. Sukarno launched a military campaign against Malaysia, and the Commonwealth nations quickly offered military assistance. The confrontation with Indonesia lasted from January 1962 to August 1966. From there, the Malaysian government realized the need for specially trained elite forces in the military arsenals. The Malaysian Special Service Unit (MSSU) — now known as Grup Gerak Khas (GGK) — was established during the confrontation. After the confrontation, a second emergency occurred, resulting in the establishment of more elite units to meet the demands.

Federal Elite Task Force
A small group of uniformed personnel is dedicated to the federal government. The members of these task forces are picked from the armed forces, law enforcement and government agencies and they receive orders only from the federal government. Considered as the most elite unit in Malaysia, candidates need to pass selected courses outlined by the Government of Malaysia to join the task forces. All federal elite task forces are administrated by the National Security Council and the Prime Minister's Office of Malaysia. Members of these elite task forces are given additional occupational allowance by the federal government. After the National Special Operations Force (NSOF) disbandment in October 2018, currently, there is only one team which is:

Special Malaysia Disaster Assistance and Rescue Team

Internationally known as SMART Team, this team is an International Search and Rescue Advisory Group (INSARAG) certified Heavy Urban search and rescue (USAR) and disaster relief task force. The SMART Team is based in Puchong, Selangor, and like the NSOF, this Special Rescue Unit only answers to the top government executives. SMART can be deployed anywhere in the world under the order of the prime minister. SMART has been involved in various missions within the country and overseas. SMART only recruits its member from the Malaysian Army, the Royal Malaysian Police and the Fire and Rescue Department of Malaysia.

Trained to operate in various types of terrains, SMART can be deployed alone as a team or deployed together with other Commando-trained teams such as GGK, PASKAU and 69 Commando, Special Forces Equivalent Units such as the Tiger Platoon and Special Rescue Units such as STORM and the SPIDER Team.

Malaysian Armed Forces
Each of the special and elite forces is selected, trained, and managed by their respective military branch. The special and elite forces can be combined into one joint force. The joint forces are administrated by Cell D of Joint Forces Headquarters. There is a plan to establish a joint command for special forces under the Malaysian Armed Forces (MAF).

Malaysian Army
There are two forces units in the Malaysian Army. One is a special force, the other is an elite airbone force. There are several Special Forces Equivalent Units.

21st Grup Gerak Khas

The 21st Grup Gerak Khas (21 GGK) is a special force of the Malaysian Army. Established in 1965 during the Indonesia-Malaysia confrontation, the GGK was selected and trained by the 40 Commando of the Royal Marines from scratch. 13 soldiers and officers graduated from the Royal Marine Basic Commando Course thus forming the nucleus of the team. It is famously known by their distinctive green beret, light blue lanyard and Fairbairn-Sykes commando knife which they inherited from the 40 Commando. The GGK's combat formation consists of two counter-insurgency regiments (21st and 22nd Commando Regiment) and one counter-terrorism regiment (11th Special Service Regiment—11 SSR). The Grup Gerak Khas is equivalent to the British Army Special Air Service and U.S. Army Green Berets.

10th Parachute Brigade

Established in 1994, the 10th Parachute Brigade was a result of Malaysia's inability to give military assistance to the Maldives when they were attacked by Tamil mercenaries in 1988. The Maldives had requested military assistance from nearby friendly nations, including Malaysia. However, Malaysia was unable to help, as they lacked a rapid deployment force. The 10th Parachute Brigade, also known as 10 Para, was established using the British Army Parachute Regiment blueprint. The 10 Para is an airborne and rapid deployment force—not a special forces unit—and its members can be recognized by their maroon beret. The 10th Parachute Brigade is equivalent to the British Army 16 Air Assault Brigade and U.S. Army 82nd Airborne Division.

Pandura Company

Pandura is an abbreviation for the Malay word Pandu Udara (Pathfinder). The Pandura Company is a Pathfinder and Special Force Equivalent Unit of the 10th Parachute Brigade (10 Para). As an elite within an elite, it only selects its members from the 10 Para. During an operation involving a parachute insertion, the Pandura members will be deployed days or weeks ahead of the main forces. They provide reconnaissance, intelligence, drop zones (DZ) and helicopter landing sites (HLS) to the main forces. They have also been tasked as forward observers for the artillery component of 10 Para and have the capability to call and correct artillery, aircraft and naval gunfire. The Pandura Company is equivalent to the British Army's Pathfinder Platoon.

Royal Intelligence Corps
The Royal Intelligence Corps is the largest military intelligence unit in Malaysia. There are four units under the RIC, two of them are combat units.

91st Intelligence Operations Group
Established in 1972, the 91 Grup Operasi Perisikan, also known as the 91 GOP, is the combat intelligence unit for the Royal Intelligence Corps. Previously known as 91 Rejimen Khas Perisikan Tempur ( 91st Combat Intelligence Special Regiment) or 91 RKPT. One of the tasks of the 91 GOP is to support secret agents from the 92nd Military Special Branch. Members of the 91 GOP are highly trained in jungle and unconventional warfare and its membership is prioritized for the Orang Asli. 91 GOP is equivalent to the British Army's Special Reconnaissance Unit.

165th Military Intelligence Branch Battalion
Established on 26 July 2008, the 165th Military Intelligence Branch Battalion, known as the 165 MIB, is a versatile tactical intelligence unit and one of the combat elements of the Malaysian Army. The 165 MIB is equipped with UAV and the latest intelligence system and can be attached to Malaysian Army Elite Forces such as 10 Para and 21 GGK as combat intelligence support. Some of the 165 MIB is trained in various military insertion methods (air, sea, land) to satisfy the need to operate with the elite 10 Para and 21 GGK. 165 MIB can also be attached to the foreign nation combat unit. The 165 MIB is equivalent to the British Army's Special Reconnaissance Regiment.

Royal Malaysian Navy
There is one Special Forces and one Special Forces Equivalent Unit in the Royal Malaysian Navy:

PASKAL

The Pasukan Khas Laut (PASKAL) is a special force of the Royal Malaysian Navy (RMN). Established in 1977 as the RMN Naval Commando Unit, the team is a part of the Navy Provost and initially tasked to give protection to RMN ships and bases. Its initial role was like that of the 43 Commando Fleet Protection Group Royal Marines. In 1982, the Naval Commando Unit was separated from the Navy Provost and then reformed into PASKAL to protect the Malaysian Exclusive Economic Zone (EEZ) as outlined by the United Nations Convention on the Law of the Sea (UNCLOS).

The first batch of the Naval Commando Unit was split into two groups. The first of them was sent to the Jungle Commando Course of the Indonesian Marine Corps, thus PASKAL inherited the Magenta Beret from the Indonesian Marine Corps. The second group was sent to the Indonesian Navy KOPASKA Commando Course. A few of the nucleus team were sent to Royal Marines Commando in United Kingdom as well as Basic Underwater Demolition/SEAL Training in United States and were given the Navy SEAL Trident upon graduation.

The tradition of giving the Trident is continued by the RMN to this day. Nowadays, each graduate of the RMN Commando School is bestowed with a magenta beret, a Fairbairn-Sykes commando knife and a Malaysian version of the SEAL Trident called Trimedia. The PASKAL is equivalent to the Royal Navy's Special Boat Service and U.S Navy's SEAL Team Six.

Naval Diving and Mine Warfare Headquarters
Established in 2013, the Naval Diving and Mine Warfare Headquarter (HqDMW) is a command for the RMN clearance diver, Explosive Ordnance Disposal (EOD) and salvage diver. The HqDMW is the Special Forces Equivalent Unit of RMN and its members are trained as frogmen (combat diver). This command is the successor of the RMN Naval Diving Unit ( 1965). On 15 September 1998, Naval Diving Unit merged with the Navy Diving School and formed as KD Duyong (internationally known as Royal Malaysian Navy Mine Warfare and Diving Centre). In 2013, the unit was separated from Duyong and made into one command. Duyong continues to serve as a diving school and training centre. HqDMW is based at Lumut RMN Naval Base and consist of teams with speciality such as:

Members of this unit can be identified by naval diver's skill badges and EOD skill badges on their uniforms. HqDMW is equivalent to the Royal Navy Fleet Diving Group, the U.S. Navy Underwater Demolition Team and the Royal Australian Navy Clearance Diving Branch.

Royal Malaysian Air Force
There is one Special Force and one Close Protection Unit in the Royal Malaysian Air Force.

PASKAU

The Pasukan Khas TUDM (PASKAU; 'RMAF Special Forces') is a special force of the Royal Malaysian Air Force (RMAF). It was established on 1 April 1980 as the Air and Ground Defence Force as a response to a Malayan Communist Party mortar attack at Kuala Lumpur RMAF Airbase, which resulted in one aircraft being lightly damaged in both 1974 and 1979. A cadre of RMAF airmen were sent to PLPK (now PULPAK) to receive Commando training and formed the first HANDAU squadron, the 102 HANDAU Squadron, in 1980. HANDAU squadrons were placed under one command/headquarter—The RMAF Security Regiment Headquarters (known as the RMAF Regiment since 1993). Initially tasked as an elite security force to RMAF airbases, on 1 June 1993, HANDAU Squadrons was renamed to RMAF Provost Squadrons and two special operations elements were added to the regiment. In 1996, the elements of the special operations were organised into one combat force—Pasukan Khas Udara (PKU; 'Air Special Forces'). The PKU strength and capabilities were included with counter-terrorism, unconventional warfare and combat search and rescue (CSAR) missions. In 1999, the RMAF Provost was separated from the RMAF Regiment and in 2002, the PKU was renamed to its current name, Pasukan Khas TUDM (PASKAU).

A PASKAU operative can be identified by the light blue beret with red cap badge backings and the light blue lanyard. The PASKAU is equivalent to the U.S. Air Force Special Tactics Squadron.

Close Escort Team
On 1 June 1993, the HANDAU was renamed to the RMAF Provost (Military police of the RMAF). Presently there is a small, specially trained team in the RMAF Provost tasked with the close protection assignment. The CET is specialised in protecting high-ranking military personnel, VIPs and also can be assigned to protect aircraft. To join the CET, airmen from RMAF Provost need to endure the three week RMAF Close Escort Course. During the course, airmen are given the law, ethics, threats, first aid, protocol, advance firearms and driving training. Upon completing the course, they are given a red beret. CET wears the same red cap badge backings as the PASKAU. The CET is equivalent to the U.S. Air Force Security Forces Phoenix Raven and the British Army Royal Military Police Close Protection Unit.

Royal Malaysia Police
The Royal Malaysia Police (RMP) is the federal police force of Malaysia. It consists of multiple Criminal Investigation Departments/Divisions (CID), an intelligence branch, traffic police, water police, riot police, tourist police, paramilitary force and so on. Most of the departments and branches have their own elite unit. However, only Special Actions Unit and 69 Commando can be formally qualified as Special Forces and both of them are placed under the Pasukan Gerakan Khas (Special Operations Command—SOCOM) of the RMP.

Special Actions Unit

The Special Actions Unit, popularly known by UTK which it is an acronym for its local name—Unit Tindak Khas but always spelled as Unit Tindakhas, is a special force and Police Tactical Unit of RMP. It is the oldest and the most experienced counter-terrorism unit in Malaysia. Established on 1 January 1975, the UTK is specially trained for counter-terrorism missions in developed areas, hostage rescue mission and also provides 24 hours close protection to high ranking government executives and their spouses (Prime Minister, Deputy Prime Minister, Ministers, former Prime Minister etc.), airborne operation, underwater operation and sometimes jungle operation. It is also tasked to provide firepower for the CIDs. During its early establishment, they were specially trained by the British Army 22nd Special Air Service (22 SAS) for urban combat. However, due to threat of terrorism they begin to have airborne unit, combat diver unit and jungle unit to encounter various type of terrorism. The relationship between the UTK and the SAS are shown on UTK's insignia.

The UTK is the Detachment A in the RMP SOCOM and its members can be identified by their maroon beret. The maroon beret worn by its members has a blueish shade (bordeaux colour or wine colour) The unit is the equivalent to a combination of the German Federal Police GSG 9, Hostage Rescue Team and the U.S. Secret Service.

69 Commando Battalion

The 69 Commando, popularly known as the Very Able Troops 69 (VAT 69), is a special force of the RMP. Established in 1969, the VAT 69 was initially an elite counter-insurgency force for RMP's paramilitary force, the Police Field Forces (also known as Jungle Police Forces, now known as General Operations Force (GOF). Modelled after the Special Air Service (SAS), a group of instructors from British SAS were sent to Fort Kemar, Perak in 1969 to supervise the RMP commando course. 30 police officers passed the course thus forming the nucleus of the team called the Jungle Squad 69. The second and third batch of Jungle Squad 69 was trained by instructors from the New Zealand Special Air Service. The VAT 69 was actively involved in counter-insurgency operations during the Second Malayan Emergency. After the Second Malayan Emergency officially ended in 1990, its role was upgraded to include urban counter-terrorism trained by the UTK. In 1997, RMP SOCOM was established, and both UTK and VAT 69 were placed under the SOCOM. Since then, the role of urban counter-terrorism for both UTK and VAT 69 was divided by states.

The VAT 69 is the Detachment B in the RMP SOCOM and its members can be identified by its sand-coloured beret like the beret worn by the British and New Zealand SAS. VAT 69 is equivalent to the Indian Central Armed Police Forces COBRA and the Colombian National Police .

UNGERIN

The Marine Assault Team, popularly known by UNGERIN which it is an abbreviation of its local name—Unit Gempur Marin—is an elite Police Tactical Unit of the RMP's water police branch, the Marine Operations Force (MOF). Established in 2006, the UNGERIN is a combat diver unit specially trained for littoral and riverine operations. It roles including coastal reconnaissance, recovery and protection of fishing vessels and fishermen's villages, conducting maritime counter-terrorism and assisting Navy, Coast Guard and Customs for maritime-related operations. It is also responsible for patrolling at ports, lakes, dams and islands alongside regular MOF policemen. During its establishment, 30 frogmen from the 69 Commando Boat Team were transferred to the MOF and formed the RMP Combat Divers Unit. In 2008, the unit's name was changed to its present name. Nowadays, the UNGERIN only recruits its member from the MOF. Candidates are trained by instructors from the 69 Commando Boat Team. Its operators also receive training from U.S. Navy SEALs and the U.S. Coast Guard.

All UNGERIN frogmen don a light blue beret like that of the regular MOF policemen. The only difference is the combat diver skill badge on their uniform. UNGERIN is equivalent to the NYPD Scuba Team.

Tiger Platoon
The Tiger Platoon is an elite Police Tactical Unit of the RMP's General Operations Force (GOF). After the 69 Commando was transferred from the GOF to the RMP SOCOM, the commanders of GOF concluded that the GOF needed another unit with capability like to that of the 69 Commando. All five brigades of the GOF are needed to train a special operations platoon for each brigade. An existing GOF unit of each brigade was re-trained to fills the task. The Tiger Platoon directly receives its orders from the GOF Brigade Commander. The Tiger Platoon's roles to include conducting counter-insurgency, counter-terrorism, Search and Rescue (SAR) and assisting Police SOCOM operations. GOF Tiger Platoons are assisted by operators from UTK, and VAT 69 is attached to the platoons in terms of training and technical aspects.

Tiger Platoon is the premier Police Tactical Unit for the Sabah and Sarawak police contingent. This is because of both Sabah and Sarawak are far from UTK and Commando 69 headquarters. Tiger Platoon is equivalent to the U.S. State Police SWAT and the German State Police SEK.

D9 Quick Actions Unit 
The Quick Actions Unit, popularly known only as UTC, is the SWAT team for the Criminal Investigation Department (CID) D9 Branch (Special Investigation Division) of RMP. Established in 1970, it was initially formed to handle threats from Chinese triads. In the 80s, Malay and Indian organised crime syndicates began to grow, thus the D9 was tasked with handling all high-risk operations against organised crime groups. The D9 teams were spread to all state police contingents to assist contingent-level CIDs.

The D9 currently is not a Semi-elite Police Tactical Unit, however, they are better trained and equipped than conventional policemen. In 2014, three Special Forces Equivalent Police Tactical Units were established for the CID and Narcotics Criminal Investigation Division (NCID). The units are the Special Task Force On Organised Crime (STAFOC), Special Tactics and Intelligence Narcotics Group (STING) and Special Task Force for Anti-Vice, Gambling and Gangsterism (STAGG). Unlike D9, all the three new units were trained by the Police SOCOM, and D9 was tasked to assist the STAFOC and STAGG operations. All three units were dissolved in 2018, and D9 was expected to take over the duty left behind by the three units. The D9 is equivalent to London's Metropolitan Police Service Specialist firearms officer.

Senoi Praaq

Senoi Praaq is Semai Language for War People. The Malay spelling is Senoi Praak. It is a paramilitary police unit that only recruits its member from Orang Asli. The Senoi Praaq is attached to the RMP paramilitary force—the General Operations Force (GOF). The role of the Senoi Praaq is like that of conventional GOF battalions, however, as jungle experts, they are also tasked with the Special Tracker role. Established in 1956 during the British Military Administration in Malaya, the Senoi Praaq was initially a commando unit trained by the Malayan Scouts (precursor of the British Army's 22 SAS) to assist them as an auxiliary force during the Malayan Emergency. After the Malayan Emergency ended, the unit was demoted from commando status to specialised paramilitary in the Department of Aboriginals (now known as Department of Orang Asli Development). In 1968, the Senoi Praaq was attached under RMP GOF and made into the GOF's 3rd Battalion. While no longer a Special Air Service Auxiliary Force, its members still carry out their traditions by wearing the maroon beret (the then colour of the SAS beret before it is changed to its current sand colour) bestowed on them by the Malayan Scouts after finishing their commando training.

Malaysia Coast Guard

The Malaysian Maritime Enforcement Agency (MMEA) has been internationally identified as the Malaysia Coast Guard since 2017. Formed in 2005, the MMEA is tasked to monitor the air and coast and enforce the law inside the Malaysia Maritime Zone (MMZ). MMEA can be integrated with the Malaysian Armed Force (MAF) during an emergency, armed conflict or war as a naval armed force.

Special Task and Rescue

The Special Task and Rescue Team, known by its acronym STAR, is a special force of the MMEA. All STAR operators are commando trained through the MAF Basic Commando Course, at the Royal Malaysian Navy (RMN) Commando School or the Royal Malaysian Air Force (RMAF) Commando School. STAR operators are spread out to all Maritime Districts in Malaysia. Because of this, the STAR is a quick reaction force tasked to deal with all piracy activities that happen within the MMZ. These tasks are shared with PASKAL of RMN and UNGERIN of the Royal Malaysian Police Marine Operations Force.

Established in 2005, a few of PASKAU and PASKAL operators were transferred to MMEA and formed the STAR nucleus team. The team is fully trained as a heliborne anti-piracy force and can be deployed via helicopter or small boat. Its members can be identified by their scarlet red beret.

The STAR is equivalent to the U.S. Coast Guard Maritime Safety and Security Team (MSST) and Maritime Security Response Team (MSRT).

MMEA Rescue Swimmer
MMEA is the main government agency responsible for managing Maritime Search And Rescue tasks in Malaysia. One Maritime Rescue Coordinating Centre (MRCC) and five Maritime Rescue Sub-Centres (MRSC) are established to perform and coordinate search and rescue operations at sea in the area of the Malaysian Maritime Search and Rescue Region (MSSR). MMEA rescue swimmers are attached to the MRCC and MRSC and on 24 hour standby. The specially trained swimmers are tasked to perform maritime search and rescue within the MMZ and can be deployed via air and sea. The task of carrying out air-sea rescue is shared with the PASKAU Maritime Para Rescue Team (MPRT). The MMEA Rescue Swimmer is equivalent to the U.S. Coast Guard Rescue Swimmer and the U.S. Navy Rescue Swimmer.

Fire and Rescue Department of Malaysia
The Fire and Rescue Department of Malaysia or FRDM is the federal-level fire and rescue agency in Malaysia. The term Special Forces are used by FRDM for its elite specially trained fire and rescue units. Members of the FRDM's Special Rescue Units can be identified by a unit patch on the right shoulder. Units trained in jungle survival have a tactical knife logo in their unit patch. Some of the units have their own distinctive uniform.

FRDM Special Forces

STORM
The Special Tactical Operation and Rescue Team of Malaysia, or STORM, is the most elite unit in FRDM. Established in March 2011, the STORM is a part of Malaysian Rapid Deployment Forces like the Malaysian Army 10th Parachute Brigade but with different tasks and roles. The overall winner of 2017 Singapore–Global Firefighters & Paramedic Challenge, STORM is the only unit in FRDM specially trained in Heavy USAR operations and Airplane and Helicopter crash operations.

Dubbed as the Komando Bomba ('Firefighter Commando'), it is the hardest unit to enter compared to other FRDM Special Forces, and most of its members are drawn from other FRDM Special Forces such as the Water Rescue Unit, EMRS, HAZMAT and MUST. Because the STORM is part of the Rapid Deployment Forces, the admittance course is arduous and almost if not on par with the basic commando course or rapid deployment course. They often work together with the federal government special rescue task force, SMART, and Malaysian Civil Defence Department's SPIDER Team.

MoSAR
The Mountain Search and Rescue Team, or MoSAR, is the elite unit of the Auxiliary Firefighter Force. Established on 23 June 2015, the MoSAR only opens its membership to auxiliary firefighters with mountaineering experience. This team is on par with other FRDM Special Forces. Its nucleus team was formed with 20 auxiliary firefighters who also worked full-time as Mount Kinabalu mountain guides. They are currently only active in Sabah.

Other federal government agencies' elite forces

Swift Actions Troop

The Swift Actions Troop, popularly known by the acronym TTC, for its local name—Trup Tindakan Cepat—is the elite team of Malaysian Prison Department. Established on 3 October 2005, the first TTC batch received counter-terrorism training at the Special Warfare Training Centre (PULPAK). Later batches received CT training from 69 Commando at the Royal Malaysia Police General Operations Force Training Centre, in Ulu Kinta. The TTC duties include transporting high-risk inmates, extracting uncooperative prisoners from their cells, daily full cell searches and high-profile security, barricaded persons, riots, mass arrest, high risk/high-profile transport and hostage situations, as well as to assist Unit Kawalan Dan Pencegahan (the Riot control units of Malaysian Prison Department) in crowd control. The TTC officers wear a scarlet red beret. The TTC is equivalent to the Russian Federal Penitentiary Service OSN Saturn and the U.S. Federal Bureau of Prisons Special Operations Response Team.

Special Tactical Team
The Special Tactical Team of the Immigration Department, better known as PASTAK, is the elite team for the Immigration Department of Malaysia (IM). Established on 13 February 2018, PASTAK is the successor to Negeri Sembilan branch IM SWAT Unit, the Grup Taktikal Khas (Special Tactical Group,  January 2014). PASTAK was entrusted by the IM to handle high-profile cases, raids and operations.

40 trainees were sent by IM to receive intensive training at the General Operations Force Training Centre, in Ulu Kinta. There, trainees received physical and counter-terrorism training possibly from 69 Commando instructors. The trainees were bestowed with a dark brown PASTAK beret at the end of their training. The PASTAK is equivalent to U.S. Immigration and Customs Enforcement Special Response Teams.

Pasukan Tindakan Khas
The Pasukan Tindakan Khas ('Special Actions Team'), better known by its acronym PTK, is the SWAT team of the Road Transport Department Malaysia. Established on 10 April 2016, the PTK's primary role is to overcome threats from organized crime syndicate-related crimes that involve road transportation such as luxury car theft, smuggling and VIN cloning. Their primary role also includes infiltrating organized theft rings as secret agents together with Royal Malaysia Police Criminal Investigation Division (CID) D7 Branch (Gambling/Vice/Secret Societies). Its secondary role is to undertake high speed car chases on highways. The PTK trainees receive counter-terrorism training at the General Operations Force Training Centre, Ulu Kinta.

COBRA

The Customs Operational Battle Force Response Assault, or popularly known by its acronym COBRA, is the elite team of the Royal Malaysian Customs. Established on 28 November 2016, COBRA's main task is to protect the customs raiding team from all kinds of threats and to eliminate high-profile threats. COBRA trainees receive counter-terrorism training at the General Operations Force Training Centre, Ulu Kinta. The COBRA is equivalent to German Customs Service Zentrale Unterstützungsgruppe Zoll and U.S. Customs and Border Protection Special Response Teams.

Special Disaster and Emergency Response Team
The Special Disaster and Emergency Response Team, better known by its acronym SPIDER Team, is the Special Rescue Unit of the Malaysia Civil Defence Force. Established on 15 August 2008 as Pasukan Khas Pertahanan Awam (PASPA), the team was renamed to its current name on 1 August 2017. The selection course lasts for six months and the trainees are trained by the SMART at SMART HQ, Puchong. Members wear a blue beret.

Inactive units

F Team
The E3F squad, codenamed the F Team, was a small, top secret intelligence unit of the Royal Malaysian Police (RMP) Special Branch (SB). Established in 1971 by Superintendent Leong Chee Woh (now Datuk), F Team's main mission was to conduct human intelligence gathering (HUMINT) from the Communist Party of Malaya (CPM) for the SB and Royal Malaysian Police (RMP). Most of F Team's secret agents were recruited from the RMP Jungle Squad (now known as the General Operations Force) and a few were recruited from surrendered CPM soldiers. F Team was sometimes involved in joint operations with the Malaysian Army commandos, the  Grup Gerak Khas. The F Team was dissolved in 1995. Its existence was kept secret by the SB for more than 45 years, and only in 2016 was the existence of the F Team revealed to the public. There is no information for the unit succeeding the F Team. F Team secret agents were equivalent to Secret Agents of the Russian Internal Intelligence Agency, the Federal Security Service.

STAFOC

The Special Task Force On Organised Crime, or STAFOC, was the Special Forces Equivalent Police Tactical Unit for the RMP Criminal Investigation Division (CID). It was established in January 2014 to make the CID more operationally independent, make any information on raids and operations less likely to be leaked out by the organized crime syndicates informants. STAFOC and CID successfully dealt with many cases and taken down large crime syndicates. STAFOC was disbanded, along with STING and STAGG, in June 2018 after the change of government in the 2018 General Election.

STING
The Special Tactics and Intelligence Narcotics Group, or STING, was the Special Forces Equivalent Police Tactical Unit for the RMP Narcotics Criminal Investigation Division (NCID). Established in January 2014 for the same reason as STAFOC, however, working with the NCID, it was disbanded in June 2018.

STAGG
The Special Task Force for Anti-Vice, Gambling and Gangsterism, or STAGG, was the Special Forces Equivalent Police Tactical Unit for RMP CID D7 Branch (Gambling/Vice/Secret Societies). Established in December 2014 for the same reason as STAFOC for the CID's D7 Branch, it was disbanded in June 2018.

National Special Operations Forces

Also known as NSOF, this task force was established in October 2016 as a response to ISIS and terror threats throughout the Southeast Asia region. In 2016, ISIS threats were happening in neighbouring countries of Malaysia, Thailand, the Philippines and Indonesia. To stop the threats from coming to Malaysia, a small but effective special operations forces with intelligence and counter-terrorism (CT) capabilities was formed. It is based at Fort Perdana, Kuala Lumpur and answers only to the top government executive—i.e. the Prime minister. The NSOF Commander directly reports to the Jawatankuasa Perancang Gerakan Kebangsaan (JPGK; 'National Movement Planning Committee') which consists of the Chief of Defence Forces and the Inspector-General of Police. The JPGK reports directly to the Prime Minister. Under the new government, the NSOF was disbanded in October 2018. The Malaysian Armed Forces plan to establish a special forces command to fills the gap after the NSOF disbandment.

The NSOF was the most elite unit in Malaysia as NSOF recruits its members from the top national CT unit—Unit Lawan Keganasan (ULK) Counter Terrorism Unit) of 11 RGK (Grup Gerak Khas), the Maritime Counter Terrorism (MCT) teams of PASKAL, the Flight Hostage Rescue Team (FHRT) of PASKAU, the Counter Terrorist Team (CTT) of VAT 69 Commando and the CT team equivalent for Special Task and Rescue (STAR) and Special Actions Unit. Special operations operators are required to undergo six months of training before beginning at the NSOF. The first batch of operators selected to join the NSOF was required to serve with the NSOF for three years. Future batches will be serving with NSOF for a minimum of two years.

The NSOF is equivalent to the Russian FSB Alpha Group and the United States Special Operations Command.

References

Special forces of Malaysia
Military of Malaysia
Royal Malaysia Police
Malaysian Maritime Enforcement Agency
Law enforcement in Malaysia
Counterterrorism in Malaysia